Kim Yong-il (born 1944) is a North Korean politician who acted as Premier (2007–2010).

Kim Yong-il may also refer to:

 Kim Yong-il (politician, born 1947), deputy foreign minister of North Korea
 Kim Yong-il (footballer) (born 1994), North Korean midfielder

See also
 Kim Jong-il (1941/1942–2011), leader of North Korea (1994–2011)
 Kim Jong-il (athlete) (born 1962), South Korean retired long jumper

Kim, Yong-il